Nikola Delev (6 January 1925 – 9 March 2004) was a Bulgarian cross-country skier. He competed in the men's 18 kilometre event at the 1948 Winter Olympics.

References

External links
 

1925 births
2004 deaths
Bulgarian male cross-country skiers
Bulgarian male Nordic combined skiers
Olympic cross-country skiers of Bulgaria
Olympic Nordic combined skiers of Bulgaria
Cross-country skiers at the 1948 Winter Olympics
Nordic combined skiers at the 1948 Winter Olympics
Place of birth missing